Harriet Pettifore Brims (1864-1939) was a pioneer female commercial photographer in Queensland, Australia. She opened a photographic studio in Ingham, Queensland before moving to Mareeba in 1904, where she established a new studio until she moved to Brisbane in 1914. Her photographic work provides information on people and places in the pioneer days of North Queensland.

She was featured in the Magnificent Makers exhibition at the State Library of Queensland in 2018.

References 

Australian photographers
1864 births
1939 deaths
Australian women photographers
20th-century Australian photographers
20th-century Australian women

External links 

 Harriett Brims collection 1890-1930, State Library of Queensland. Collection of Brims' digitised photography.